Yves Velan, (29 August 1925 in Saint-Quentin, Aisne – 6 May 2017) was a Swiss writer from Bassins.

Biography 
He studied literature at Lausanne, where he joined the Society of Belles Lettres, and worked two years as a reader at the University of Florence. In 1950 he was one of the founders the leftist co-operative publishing house, Éditions Rencontre which published the literary magazine La revue Rencontre.

A communist, he was a member of the Swiss Party of Labour from the end of the war until 1957. He was forbidden to work and was excluded from teaching in the Canton of Vaud. He then moved to La Chaux-de-Fonds, Canton of Neuchâtel where he taught literature at the gymnasium until his retirement in 1991. In the late sixties he temporarily left the Neuchâtel Jura for a long stay in the United States where he taught French literature at the University of Illinois at Urbana–Champaign.

His first novel Je was published in 1959 in Paris. He also published two novels, La Statue de Condillac retouchée (1973), Soft Goulag (1977) and an essay, Contre-pouvoir, where he questions culture and its requirements. In addition to these books, there are numerous publications in reviews, a "essay-poem", Onir (1974), a tale, Le Chat muche (1986). Moreover, during the years 1950 to 1980, he had an important activity of criticism published in France, the United States and French-speaking Switzerland.

Yves Velan received the Grand Prix C. F. Ramuz and the literature prize of the canton of Neuchâtel for his work.

Velan died on 6 May 2017.

Publications 
1959:  Je, Éditions du Seuil
1973: La Statue de Condillac retouchée, Seuil
1974: Onir, in Écriture 9, éditions Bertil Galland, Vevey
1977: Soft Goulag, éditions Bertil Galland, Vevey

Bibliography  
 Pascal Antonietti, Yves Velan, New York/Amsterdam, Rodopi, 2005

References

Sources 
 Écrivain vaudois
 A contre temps, huitante textes vaudois de 1980 à 1380, p. 37 
 Hadrien Buclin, Entre culture du consensus et critique sociale. Les intellectuels de gauche dans la Suisse de l'après-guerre (1945-1968), Thèse de doctorat, Université de Lausanne, 2015. 
 Alain Nicollier, Henri-Charles Dahlem, Dictionnaire des écrivains suisses d'expression française, vol. 2, p. 874-877 
 Histoire de la littérature en Suisse romande, under the dir. de R. Francillon, vol. 3, p. 445-456 
 La Revue de Belles-Lettres, 1992, no 3-4 La machine Velan devoted to Yves Velan

External links 
 Je, par Yves Vélan
 A D S - Autorinnen und Autoren der Schweiz - Autrices et Auteurs de Suisse - Autrici ed Autori della Svizzera
 CULTURE :: Lire encore Yves Velan
 Portrait d'Yves Velan
 Yves Velan : Blogres, le blog d'écrivains
 TSR Archives

1925 births
2017 deaths
People from Saint-Quentin, Aisne
20th-century Swiss novelists
21st-century Swiss novelists
Prix Fénéon winners
Swiss literary critics
Academic staff of the University of Florence
Swiss writers in French